Carl William Bax (born January 5, 1966) is a former American football offensive lineman. He played two seasons for the National Football League's Tampa Bay Buccaneers. He was suspended for the first three games of his second season for trafficking steroids.

During his senior year at Missouri, Bax was diagnosed with stomach cancer. He underwent surgery to remove a tumor in August 1988, and returned for his senior season.

References 

1966 births
Living people
People from St. Charles, Missouri
Players of American football from Missouri
American football offensive linemen
Missouri Tigers football players
Tampa Bay Buccaneers players
American sportspeople in doping cases
Doping cases in American football